Sacred Heart Roman Catholic Church, also known as Confederate Memorial Chapel and as the Sacred Heart Catholic Church, is a Gothic Revival style Christian church in Port Gibson, Mississippi.

History
The church was built in 1868 in the town of Rodney, Mississippi.

In 1983. the Rodney Foundation donated the building to the state, which moved it to Grand Gulf Military State Park in Port Gibson, Mississippi. Once in the park, the church was restored to its original condition and is now used as a non-denominational chapel.

It was declared a Mississippi Landmark in 1985 and listed on the National Register of Historic Places in 1987.

References

Churches on the National Register of Historic Places in Mississippi
Carpenter Gothic church buildings in Mississippi
Roman Catholic churches completed in 1868
19th-century Roman Catholic church buildings in the United States
Mississippi Landmarks
Churches in Claiborne County, Mississippi
National Register of Historic Places in Claiborne County, Mississippi
Confederate States of America monuments and memorials in Mississippi